Sea Hill Lighthouse, also known as Sea Hill Point Light or Little Sea Hill Light, is a lighthouse on the northwest point of Curtis Island, Gladstone Region, Queensland, Australia. Its purpose was to mark the east side of the entrance to Keppel Bay, on passage to Fitzroy River and Port Alma. The first lighthouse at the locations was constructed in 1873 or 1876, moved in the 1920s, and is now on display at the Gladstone Maritime Museum. A second lighthouse was constructed in 1895 and its state is unclear.

History

First lighthouse
The need for a lighthouse at this location was identified in 1864. The first lighthouse, constructed in 1873 or 1876, was the first in Queensland of its design, made of a hardwood frame clad with corrugated iron. This design was then used in seven more lighthouses, by order of establishment, Grassy Hill Light, Goods Island Light, Bay Rock Light, Old Caloundra Light, North Point Hummock Light (demolished), Gatcombe Head Light (demolished) and Bulwer Island Light. With the installation of the second lighthouse in 1895 it became the front light in the range. It stood there until it was deactivated in the 1960s and then sold into private hands.

The lighthouse is rather short, only  in height. Unlike the other seven Queensland lighthouse towers of the corrugated iron clad type, it is hexagonal in plan, rather than round. A gallery and a lantern top the tower, and much like other Queensland lighthouses, it is painted white with a red dome.

Second lighthouse

The second lighthouse was constructed in 1895 and for a while served as the rear light in the range. The original optical apparatus was a 4th order fixed lens with kerosene wick burner. In 1930 the light was converted to an open flame acetylene gas burner, with sun valve and flasher, which operated at least until 1975. By 1977 the original lens had been removed and a solar powered Tideland ML-300 electric beacon installed. A pilot station was established on the foreshore nearby in 1919  and was closed in 1963.

The current state of the lighthouse is unclear. There are reports that the lighthouse was deactivated in 2006. While there were reports that it was demolished in early 2009, other reported that it was standing in 2014.

See also

 List of lighthouses in Australia

Notes

References

Lighthouses completed in 1876
Lighthouses in Queensland
Gladstone Region
1876 establishments in Australia
Queensland Heritage Register
History of transport in Queensland